The ILS World Life Saving Championships are the world championships for lifesaving sport events. They are sanctioned by the International Life Saving Federation (ILS), conducted every 2 years, and commonly marketed and known as the ‘Rescue’ series, for example – Rescue 2008.

The World Life Saving Championships incorporate  - National Teams World Championships, Interclub Teams World Championships, Masters World Championships, Surfboats World Championships and IRB World Championships.  Additional championships can include additional events such as March Past, Long distance Race.  The World Championships typically attract between 3,000 and 5,000 competitors and officials, and are conducted over a period of 12 to 14 days.

History
Prior to the amalgamation of WLS and FIS in 1993 to create ILS, both WLS and FIS conducted World Championship events in Life Saving Sports.  Founded in 1971 WLS conducted ocean and beach based world championships for National Teams in South Africa in 1974 and Interclub World Championships in 1981 and 1983. The 1988, 1990, and 1992 Rescue series of World Championship events were also organised by WLS. Rescue 88, the 1988 World Championships were the first international championships to conduct both ocean and pool events. In 1956 prior to the advent of WLS, as part of the 1956 Olympic Games celebrations Surf Life Saving Australia (a founding member of WLS) hosted an International Lifesaving Championships at Torquay Beach in which teams from several countries competed against each other. It could be argued that this was the first World Lifesaving Championships for ocean and beach events.  Founded in 1910, member nations of FIS agreed to conduct World Championships in pool life saving events.  The first such championships were conducted in Paris, France in 1955 and were held sporadically over the next 40 years until the final FIS Championships in 1995. These contests were strictly for national representative teams only. Since 1996, World Life Saving Championships have been conducted solely by ILS every two years.

List of competitions

References

External links
 http://www.ilsf.org/

Swimming safety
Surf lifesaving
Life Saving
Lifesaving competitions